Joe Wallace Aguillard (born July 15, 1956) served as the eighth president of the Southern Baptist-affiliated Louisiana College in Pineville in Rapides Parish in Central Louisiana.

Controversies involving Aguillard

Failed Promises of Law, Medical, and Film Schools
Due to what many community leaders describe as 'failed promises', and 'false information' by Aguillard, the law school never materialized.

Aguillard also guaranteed the future establishment of a medical school, and film school. Neither of which came to fruition.

Timothy Johnson and Charles Quarles disputes

Argile Smith, the executive vice president, the vice president of Integration of Faith and Learning, and Aguillard's eventual interim successor as the Louisiana College president, said, "The faculty, staff, and students, have been so supportive through this journey. Our President has shown us how to work through a crisis with the kind of integrity that comes from a resilient relationship with Christ. Now that the crisis is behind us, Louisiana College can get back to fulfilling our mission, 'to change the World for Christ!'".

"Louisiana College is focused on moving past the Calvinism coup and strategically addressing her mission, of bringing every lost soul to Christ as we strive to fulfill our Mission", said Aguillard. Dr. Tommy French, chairman of the Louisiana College trustees, said, "The board is thrilled at the SACS Reaffirmation in December, 2013 and looks forward to the bright future as our President leads Louisiana College to fulfill her mission."

Sex scandal cover-up and forgery
On February 26, 2014, two documents were leaked online disclosing an alleged blackmail attempt by Aguillard's former assistant, Joseph Cole.  The first document, released minutes from an executive committee meeting of the Louisiana College Board of Trustees, contends that Cole threatened to leak "office secrets" to The Alexandria Daily Town Talk or Save Our Louisiana College unless the college paid him $25,000 cash plus overtime pay and benefits.  Cole claimed that Aguillard forged signatures on official SACS documents, abused pain medications, and had knowledge of an incident in a hotel room involving Cole, pornography, and two Louisiana College male college freshmen prior to his hiring of Cole as his executive assistant.

The second document contained the college's agreement to pay Cole the $25,000; in exchange, Cole was to sign a non-disclosure agreement with the college.  The document contains a letter from the Armour Law Firm, which then represented Louisiana College. This document confirms Cole's claims that Aguillard had forged multiple signatures on official SACS documents and had hindered an internal investigation into the matter. When Aguillard, who had previously recused himself from the matter, insisted that Armour immediately surrender all of the information pertaining to the Joseph Cole dispute, the law firm decided not to renew its contract with Louisiana College and wrote:

Student strike against Aguillard

The story made state and national headlines with several media organizations saying that the administration had violated the students' First Amendment rights.

Forced Resignation

Though Aguillard remained president-emeritus and a faculty member after he was forced to resign the Louisiana College presidency, he was finally terminated from both positions in the spring of 2016 following an evaluation. In September 2016, Aguillard filed suit in the 9th Judicial District Court in Alexandria to seek damages for "civil conspiracy" involving breach of contract, assault and battery, and emotional distress. The defendants include Louisiana College, Aguillard's permanent presidential successor Rick Brewer, private investigator Don Benton Connor Sr., and the insurance underwriting firm RSUI Indemnity Company. An out-of-court settlement was believed to have been pending in December 2016.

Then in late May 2017, Louisiana College filed a civil suit seeking unspecified damages for defamation against former President Aguillard,  who it alleges "engaged in a regular and pervasive campaign to undercut" the institution including "ghostwriting faculty member grievances" against the administration.  The suit cites an "anonymous package" reportedly circulated by Aguillard of "derogatory statements" about the college. Individual plaintiffs include Louisiana College president Rick Brewer and Cheryl Clark, whom Aguillard accused of having illegally changed the final grades of more than "a dozen nursing students."

References

 

1956 births
Living people
People from Basile, Louisiana
People from Beauregard Parish, Louisiana
People from Pineville, Louisiana
Educators from Louisiana
School superintendents in Louisiana
Presidents of Louisiana Christian University
Louisiana Christian University alumni
McNeese State University alumni
Nova Southeastern University alumni
Baptists from Louisiana
Louisiana Republicans